The Hungry Years is an album of archive recordings by Willie Nelson released along with the original IRS-forced direct sales release of Who'll Buy My Memories in November 1991. The recordings were made in Bogalusa, Louisiana in 1976.

References

1991 albums
Willie Nelson albums